John Carroll "Cap" Clark (September 19, 1906 – February 16, 1957) was an American professional baseball player. He played in Major League Baseball as a catcher for the Philadelphia Phillies. Born in Snow Camp, North Carolina, Clark graduated from Elon University in 1927. In , his only year in Major League Baseball, he played 52 games for the Phillies, 29 of them as the starting catcher. Clark died February 16, 1957, in Fayetteville, North Carolina.

References

External links

Baseball Almanac biography

1906 births
1957 deaths
People from Snow Camp, North Carolina
Elon University alumni
Baseball players from North Carolina
Major League Baseball catchers
Philadelphia Phillies players
Minor league baseball managers
Henderson Gamecocks players
Greensboro Patriots players
Asheville Tourists players
Rochester Red Wings players
Columbus Red Birds players
Sacramento Solons players
Houston Buffaloes players
Centreville Colts players
Dover Orioles players